La Plata River is a  tributary to the San Juan River in La Plata County, Colorado, and San Juan County, New Mexico, in the United States.

The Navajo name for the river, Tsé Dogoi Nlini translates as "flowing over projecting rock".

See also

 List of rivers of Colorado
 List of rivers of New Mexico
 List of tributaries of the Colorado River

References

External links

Rivers of Colorado
Rivers of New Mexico
Farmington, New Mexico
Tributaries of the Colorado River in New Mexico
Rivers of San Juan County, New Mexico
Tributaries of the Colorado River in Colorado
Old Spanish Trail (trade route)